Thomas Chilton (July 30, 1798 – August 15, 1854) was a U.S. Representative from Kentucky, a prominent Baptist clergyman, and the ghost writer of David Crockett's autobiography.

Born near Lancaster, Kentucky, a son of Rev. Thomas John Chilton and Margaret Bledsoe, Chilton attended schools in Paris, Kentucky. One week before his seventeenth birthday he married and commenced study for ordination as a Baptist minister. Simultaneously he began studying for the bar with Jesse Bledsoe, a maternal uncle. After setting up a law practice in Owingsville he was elected to the State House of Representatives at age 21. Chilton became enamored of the political persona of Andrew Jackson and carried Jackson's banner to the Twenty-first Congress from Elizabeth, Kentucky. Chilton was first seated in the U.S. House of Representatives on January 11, 1828.

In Washington, DC Chilton took residence at the boarding house of Mary Ball. He was lodged in the same room as a Representative from Tennessee, named David Crockett. The two men rapidly became friends and would spend the better part of the next six years acting in political concert. The most significant event they shared was disillusion with Andrew Jackson, and abandonment of his political party in March 1830. Chilton failed in his bid for reelection to the Twenty-second Congress but was elected as an Anti-Jacksonian to the Twenty-third Congress. By the end of that term both Chilton and Crockett were tired of dealing with the Jackson machine and associated dirty tricks. The two men were glad to turn their backs on Washington. In 1835 Chilton chose to resume the Baptist ministry in addition to law practice. He owned slaves.

The Narrative

In 1834 a Philadelphia publisher released a book titled Narrative of the Life of David Crockett of the State of Tennessee. Many readers suspected that this autobiography was crafted by someone other than Crockett himself. It had indeed been crafted by Chilton, from Crockett's written material and in response to questioning, but the agreement between these friends was absolute public silence on the matter. After a century of historical suspicion the details were unearthed during research by Crockett biographer, James Atkins Shackford. Shackford discovered two letters in Crockett's hand which revealed the circumstances.

The first letter, written to his son John and dated January 10, 1834 says:

The second letter, written to Messrs Cary & Hart, publishers, and dated February 23, 1834 says in part:

After leaving Congress
Chilton remained in Kentucky for the next four years. In 1839 he  removed his family to Talladega, Alabama. This was the location of his younger brother William Parish Chilton who had just been elected to the State legislature. Chilton continued some law practice but also accepted the pulpit of the Hope Baptist Church in Talladega. During a revival meeting, Chilton led to conversion his maternal cousin Robert Emmett Bledsoe Baylor. Baylor subsequently was ordained a minister of the Baptist faith, relocated to Texas, and in 1845 co-founded Baylor University in Independence, Texas. (Baylor was relocated to Waco, Texas in 1885.)

In 1841 Chilton served as president of the Alabama Baptist State Convention. After his first wife died in September 1842, he married a woman from his Talladega congregation and accepted a call to pastor the First Baptist Church of Montgomery, Alabama. Later, he pastored churches in Greensboro and Newbern.

In August 1851  Chilton was invited to pastor the First Baptist Church in Houston, Texas. He removed from Alabama with his wife, Louisa nee Conklin, and their six young children. He began his ministry there December 6, 1851 but resigned October 28, 1853 to pastor a church in Montgomery, Texas. While delivering a sermon on August 15, 1854 he suddenly clutched his chest, collapsed, and died of a heart attack before the congregation.

The town of Chilton, Texas was named for his son, Lysias B. Chilton.  A grandson, Horace Chilton became a U.S. Senator from Texas, and was actually the first native born Texan to serve in Congress.

Genealogical annoyance

Thomas Chilton was not the first-born son of Baptist clergyman Thomas John Chilton and does not bear his middle name as a Junior. On August 8, 1815 he received written permission from his father to marry "Frances T. Stoner".  The "T" stood for her middle name, Tribble, but Chilton is identified only as Thomas, with no middle initial recorded by his own father.  It has been reported, incorrectly, that Thomas Chilton's gravestone in Montgomery County, Texas bears the middle initial "B".

References

Johnson, Frank M., "Montgomery County, Texas, CSA" September, 2013: 34-39.
Hannum, Sharon Elain, "Thomas Chilton: Lawyer, Politician, Preacher." Filson Club History Quarterly 38, April 1964: 97-114.
Shackford, James Atkins, "The Author of David Crockett's Autobiography." The Boston Public Library Quarterly, October 1951: 294-304

External links
Guide to Thomas H. Chilton correspondence, housed at the University of Kentucky Libraries Special Collections Research Center

1798 births
1854 deaths
People from Garrard County, Kentucky
American people of English descent
Baptist ministers from the United States
Baptists from Kentucky
Jacksonian members of the United States House of Representatives from Kentucky
National Republican Party members of the United States House of Representatives from Kentucky
American biographers
American male biographers
American slave owners
People from Paris, Kentucky
19th-century American writers